Preston W. Smith is an American politician from the U.S. state of Georgia.

Smith earned a Bachelor of Business Administration (B.B.A.) from Southern Baptist Convention affiliated Baylor University and a J.D. from the University of Georgia and practiced law before turning to electoral politics.  Republican candidate Smith was elected to the Georgia State Senate for District 52 in 2002 by defeating Democratic candidate Richard Marable 16,957 votes (54.2%) to 14,329 votes (45.8%). Serving as Governor Sonny Perdue’s  floor leader in the Senate, Smith also serves on several Senate committees including Ethics & Government Reform as vice-chairman, Health & Human Services as secretary, Appropriations, Economic Development & Tourism, Judiciary and Children & Youth. Smith is a member of the Gridiron Secret Society as well as serving on the board of directors at the Summit Ministries, an  evangelical Christian organization focusing on high school and college aged Christians.  In 2005, he successfully led the effort to reform Georgia's statewide civil liability system (SB3, 2005).

References

External links
Georgia Senate profile

Year of birth missing (living people)
Living people
Baylor University alumni
University of Georgia alumni
Republican Party Georgia (U.S. state) state senators
21st-century American politicians